Swinburne is a little village just off the N3 road south of Harrismith, in the Free State province of South Africa.

Swinburne is a stopover point for travellers between Johannesburg and Durban, perched on the edge of the Drakensberg escarpment. The village has few amenities above a basic shop, restaurant and pub.

It has one of the oldest bridges in the Free State which was opened 1884 and spans the Wilge River.

References

Populated places in the Maluti a Phofung Local Municipality